Elachista inaudita is a moth of the family Elachistidae. It is found in Canada, where it has been recorded from Ontario.

The wingspan is about 10 mm. The forewings are brassy brown at the base, shading outwardly into dark blackish brown in the apical half, with a faint purple luster replacing the brassy luster of the base of the wing. There is an elongate creamy white spot in the fold near the base, as well as a large white spot on the dorsum and a triangular oblique curved white spot on the costa beyond the dorsal spot. The hindwings are dark brown.

The larvae feed on Scirpus species. They mine the leaves of their host plant. Young larvae probably create a narrow mine. Nearly full-grown larvae make a broad gradually widening brownish mine, extending towards the tip of the leaf.

References

inaudita
Moths described in 1927
Moths of North America